Joseph Frazer Nixon (14 July 1896–1977) was an English footballer who played in the Football League for Crystal Palace.

References

1896 births
1977 deaths
English footballers
Association football defenders
English Football League players
Crystal Palace F.C. players